John Cournos, born Ivan Grigorievich Korshun (6 March 1881 – 27 August 1966), was a writer and translator of Russian Jewish background who spent his later life in exile.

Early life
Cournos was born in Zhytomyr, Russian Empire (now in Ukraine), and his first language was Yiddish; he studied Russian, German, and Hebrew with a tutor at home. When he was ten years old his family emigrated to Philadelphia, where he learned English.

Literary career
In June 1912, Cournos moved to London, where he freelanced as an interviewer and critic for both UK and US publications and began his literary career as a poet and, later, novelist. He later emigrated to the US, where he spent the rest of his life.

He was one of the Imagist poets, but is better known for his novels, short stories, essays, and criticism, as well as a translator of Russian literature. He used the pseudonym John Courtney. He also wrote for The Philadelphia Record under the pseudonym "Gorky."

Later in life he married Helen Kestner Satterthwaite (1893–1960), who was also an author and published under the pseudonyms Sybil Norton and John Hawk. However, Cournos is better-known for his unhappy affair with Dorothy L. Sayers, fictionalised by Sayers in the detective book Strong Poison (1930) and by Cournos himself in The Devil Is an English Gentleman (1932).

Cournos and his wife, under her pseudonym Sybil Norton, collaborated on several books, including "Famous Modern American Novelists," "Famous British Novelists," "Best World Short Stories of 1947," and "John Adams" a biography.

Anti-communism
In the aftermath of the October Revolution Cournos was involved with a London-based anti-Communist organisation, the Russian Liberation Committee. On its behalf, he wrote in 1919 a propaganda pamphlet, London under the Bolsheviks: A Londoner's Dream on Returning from Petrograd, based largely on what he saw during his 1917–1918 visit to Aleksey Remizov in Petrograd, whose Chasy he was then translating as The Clock. It closely follows the early events of the Bolshevik seizure of power in Russia, and it was set in Britain to better enable the British audience to imagine what it was like. Sinclair Lewis used the same device to imagine a Fascist takeover in the United States in his 1935 work It Can't Happen Here.

In Cournos's lurid but humorous future history, a British revolutionary regime introduces a new currency named "The MacDonald" for Ramsay MacDonald, who is, however, soon shoved aside by the Bolshevik leaders "MacLenin" and "Trotsman" (obvious satires of Lenin and Trotsky). A counter-revolutionary drive by General Haig is defeated at St Albans, and the Bolsheviks start rounding up their former allies. Lloyd George is imprisoned in the Tower of London. H.G. Wells, too, is imprisoned by the Bolsheviks, despite his left-leaning book Love and Mr Lewisham. London is portrayed as plagued by poverty, with black market cigarettes and broken lifts, and the narrator wanders round the Strand exclaiming at the filth of the streets, the idlers and the jealous envy towards his new boots.

Death
Cournos died in New York City.

Bibliography
Gordon Craig and the Theatre of the Future (1914)
The Mask (1919)
London Under the Bolsheviks (1919)
The Wall (1921?)
Babel (1922)
The Best British Short Stories of 1922 (as Editor, 1922?)
In Exile (1923)
The New Candide (1924)
Sport of Gods (1925)
Miranda Masters (1926)
O'Flaherty the Great (1928)
A Modern Plutarch (1928)
Short Stories out of Soviet Russia (1929)
Grandmother Martin Is Murdered (1930)
Wandering Women/The Samovar (1930)
The Devil Is an English Gentleman (1932)
Autobiography (1935)
An Epistle to the Hebrews (1938)
An Open Letter to Jews and Christians (1938)
Hear, O Israel (1938)
Book of Prophecy from Egyptians to Hitler (1938)
A Boy Named John (1941)
A Treasury of Russian Life and Humor (1943)
Famous Modern American Novelists (1952)
Pilgrimage to Freedom (1953; written jointly with Sybil Norton, illustrated by Rus Anderson)
American Short Stories of the Nineteenth Century (1955: Everyman's Library)
A Teasury of Classic Russian literature (1961)
With Hey, Ho... and The Man with the Spats (1963)
The Created Legend – translation of a book by Fyodor Sologub [pseud.] (unknown date of publication)

References

External links
 
 
 
 List of books on the Open Library
 Dictionary of Literary Biography on John Cournos
 John Cournos's online introduction to Gogol's "Taras Bulba and Other Tales"
 An account by Alfred Satterthwaite, Cournos's stepson
 

1881 births
1966 deaths
20th-century British novelists
20th-century British poets
20th-century British translators
British anti-communists
British essayists
British expatriates in the United States
British male novelists
British male short story writers
British short story writers
Imagists
Emigrants from the Russian Empire to the United Kingdom
Emigrants from the Russian Empire to the United States
British male essayists
British male poets
Russian–English translators
Russian anti-communists
Ukrainian Jews
20th-century British short story writers
20th-century essayists